The 1883–84 season was the 11th Scottish football season in which Dumbarton competed at a national level.

Scottish Cup

After the success of the previous season, Dumbarton fell at the 'first hurdle' in the Scottish Cup by losing to local rivals Renton.

Glasgow Charity Cup

Dumbarton's fortunes were no better in the Glasgow Charity Cup where they lost at the semi final stage to 3rd LRV.  A protest was lodged by Dumbarton after the game that their opponents had played several players from other teams - against SFA rules.  However the basis of the objection was doomed to failure, due in part to the fact that the game had been refereed by the president of the SFA, and if the protest had been successful, Queen's Park's victory over Rangers would have had to be replayed, as the QP team was similarly sprinkled with 'guest' players - indeed it seemed that very few decisions went against Queens Park in those days!

Friendlies/other matches

Notwithstanding the early cup exit, Dumbarton's fixture card was a busy one.

The season began with a charity match against Rangers in aid of the Daphne Disaster Fund. This was followed in Scotland with home and away fixtures against Queen's Park, Vale of Leven, Rangers, St Mirren (the Renfrewshire Cup holders) and St Bernards - all 10 of which were won, in addition to a 7-0 thumping of Ayrshire Cup holders Kilmarnock Athletic.

There were also 12 'friendly' matches played against English opposition, including home and away fixtures against Aston Villa, Walsall Swifts, Nottingham Forest, Blackburn Rovers and Blackburn Olympic, the 1882-83 FA Cup winners.  The 6-1 win at Boghead against 'Olympic' was at the time recognised as the unofficial Championship of Great Britain.

In all, 23 matches were won, 1 drawn and 7 lost, scoring 95 goals and conceding 38.

Player statistics

Of note amongst those donning the club's colours for the first time was Robert 'Plumber' Brown.

Only includes appearances and goals in competitive Scottish Cup matches.

Source:

International caps

An international trial match was played on 8 March 1884 to consider selection of teams to represent Scotland against Ireland, England and Wales in the inaugural British Home Championship. Joe Lindsay, James McAulay, William McKinnon and Peter Miller were all selected to play for the 'Probables' against an 'Improbable' XI which included 'Sparrow' Brown and Jock Hutcheson.  The game ended in a 2-2 draw with McKinnon scoring one of the 'Probables' goals.

Subsequently, the following Dumbarton players were selected:

- Robert 'Sparrow' Brown earned his first and second caps against Ireland and Wales respectively.

- Joe Lindsay earned his fourth and fifth caps against England and Wales respectively, scoring a goal in the 4-1 win over the Welsh.

- William McKinnon earned his third and fourth caps against England and Wales respectively.

- James McAulay earned his fourth cap against England and Michael Paton earned his second cap against Wales.

Reserve team
Dumbarton reached the final of the Scottish Second XI Cup for the second time in three seasons before losing out to the holders, Kilmarnock Athletic.

On the same day as the international trial, a Dumbartonshire XI played against a Glasgow XI to raise funds for the Second Eleven Association. Ralph Aitken, James Liddell, James Miller and W Watt played, with Miller scoring twice and Watt once in the 4-1 win.

References

Dumbarton F.C. seasons
Scottish football clubs 1883–84 season